Henry "Harry" Cairney (born 1 September 1961) is a former Scottish football  player and manager. He made over 700 appearances in the Scottish Football League for Airdrieonians, Stenhousemuir and Brechin City. Cairney has also managed Annan Athletic and Arbroath.

Career

Cairney was born in Holytown and began his senior career with Airdrieonians, making his senior debut in a match against Rangers at Ibrox. He then played for Stenhousemuir, where he made over 300 league appearances. In 1992, he joined Brechin City, where he stayed for 11 years and made over 350 appearances. He retired in 2003 and was appointed as manager of East of Scotland League side Annan Athletic.

Cairney moved to Arbroath in September 2004, but resigned just over a year later. Cairney subsequently rejoined Annan, and was manager at the time of their election to the Scottish League in July 2008. He won the Scottish Football League award for Third Division manager after his first month in the league. Cairney resigned his position as Annan manager in December 2012, citing family and health reasons.

Cairney also teaches Physics and Chemistry at Mearns Castle High School in Newton Mearns.

Managerial statistics

See also
 List of footballers in Scotland by number of league appearances (500+)

References

External links

1961 births
Living people
Footballers from North Lanarkshire
Scottish footballers
Stenhousemuir F.C. players
Brechin City F.C. players
Airdrieonians F.C. (1878) players
Arbroath F.C. managers
Annan Athletic F.C. managers
Scottish Football League players
Scottish football managers
Scottish Football League managers
Association football defenders